William Lehman or William Lehmann may refer to:

William Lehman (Florida politician) (1913–2005), Florida congressman
William Eckart Lehman (1821–1895), Pennsylvania congressman
William Lehman (soccer) (1901–1979), American soccer player
William E. Lehman (architect) (1874–1951), architect based in New Jersey
William Lehmann (Coyote McCloud; 1942–2011), radio disc jockey in Nashville, Tennessee

See also
 Wilhelm Lehmann (disambiguation)